"You Make My Dreams" is a song by the American duo Hall & Oates, taken from their ninth studio album, Voices (1980). The song reached number five on the Billboard Hot 100 chart in 1981. The track received 154,000 digital sales between 2008 and 2009 according to Nielsen SoundScan.

The song has sold over 1 million copies in the UK to date, despite having never charted in the country.

Composition
John Oates said the song came about "through a happy accident, my guitar player friend of mine and myself were jamming in the dressing room, and I started playing a delta blues and he started playing a Texas swing, and we put them together, and all of a sudden into my head popped "you make my dreams." I just started singing it. I don't know why, but I did. And it sounded really cool and everyone liked it. It was as simple as that."

Daryl Hall also commented on the iconic piano riff that opens the song and the distinctive sound that is generated by a Yamaha CP30 in an interview with the BBC on the 40th anniversary of the song’s release. “It's a very unusual edition of a Yamaha called the Yamaha CP30. There were very few of them made and it wasn't out for very long. Over the years mine got destroyed [and] I cannot duplicate that sound other than with the actual instrument. So I had to search and search until, quite recently, I found one.”

Reception
Record World praised the song's "vocal and musical inspiration."

In popular culture
The song features in a memorable scene in the 2009 film (500) Days of Summer, where Joseph Gordon-Levitt's character breaks out into a spontaneous dance number while walking down the street. Daryl Hall and John Oates themselves were originally going to be included in this scene.

Personnel 
Daryl Hall – lead vocals and backing vocals, synthesizer
John Oates – electric guitar and backing vocals
John Siegler – bass and backing vocals
Jerry Marotta – drums

Charts

Weekly charts

Year-end charts

Certifications

References

1980 songs
1981 singles
Hall & Oates songs
Songs written by John Oates
Songs written by Daryl Hall
RCA Records singles
Songs written by Sara Allen
Songs about dreams